This is a list of episodes for the fourth season (1953–54) of the television version of The Jack Benny Program. This season is mostly known for Humphrey Bogart and Marilyn Monroe being on the show (separately). This year had major movie stars of the time, more likely to attract more viewers. The show's rankings had gone down 33% from last year, but the show was still popular, and the next season would get more views. This season the program was the 16th highest-ranking show.

Episodes

References
 
 

1953 American television seasons
1954 American television seasons
Jack 04